William "Tra" Thomas III (born November 20, 1974) is a former American football offensive tackle in the National Football League (NFL), who is currently the offensive line coach for IMG Academy. He was drafted by the Philadelphia Eagles 11th overall in the 1998 NFL Draft. He played for the Eagles for 11 seasons, from 1998–2008. He played college football at Florida State.

Thomas was also a member of the Jacksonville Jaguars and San Diego Chargers. He was a one-time All-Pro and three-time Pro Bowl selection in his career.

Early years
Thomas attended DeLand High School in DeLand, Florida and was a letterman in football.

Professional career

Philadelphia Eagles
Thomas was drafted by the Philadelphia Eagles 11th overall in the 1998 NFL Draft. He played for the Eagles from 1998–2008, starting 165 of 166 games at left offensive tackle. He made three Pro Bowls with the Eagles.

Jacksonville Jaguars
On March 9, 2009, Thomas signed with the Jacksonville Jaguars as a free agent. He was released on February 11, 2010.

San Diego Chargers
Thomas was signed by the San Diego Chargers to a one-year contract on June 9, 2010. He underwent arthroscopic surgery on his knee during training camp.

Retirement
Thomas officially retired from the NFL as a Philadelphia Eagle on August 16, 2012.

Coaching career
Thomas rejoined the Philadelphia Eagles as a coaching intern in 2013, working primarily with the offensive line. He was hired following training camp as an offensive assistant coach. His contract expired after the 2014 season and he was not re-signed.

He is currently the offensive line coach at IMG Academy in Bradenton, Florida.

Broadcast career
In 2011, Thomas replaced Vaughn Hebron as an analyst for Eagles Post Game Live on Comcast SportsNet Philadelphia, which airs after every Philadelphia Eagles game. In 2019, Thomas joined 97.5 WPEN for their morning broadcast with Marc Farzetta. On March 31, 2020 Thomas was let go from 97.5 due to cutbacks by Beasely Media Group.

Name changes
Thomas' given name is William Thomas III; during the Ray Rhodes era, the Eagles had a Pro Bowl linebacker also named William Thomas. During his early years in the NFL, Thomas was referred to by his nickname, "Tra". However, before the 2006 season, Thomas requested to be called William Thomas. In April 2008, he decided to return to Tra Thomas after the name William failed to catch on.

References

External links

 Philadelphia Eagles coaching bio

1974 births
Living people
People from DeLand, Florida
Players of American football from Florida
American football offensive tackles
Florida State Seminoles football players
Philadelphia Eagles players
Philadelphia Eagles coaches
Jacksonville Jaguars players
San Diego Chargers players
Sportspeople from Volusia County, Florida
National Conference Pro Bowl players